Acanthodoris vatheleti is a species of sea slug, a dorid nudibranch, a shell-less marine gastropod mollusc in the family Onchidorididae.

This is a nomen dubium.

Distribution 
This species was described from Orange Bay, Punta Arenas,  Cape Horn, Chile. It was inadequately described and has not been reported since the original description. It may be synonymous with Acanthodoris falklandica.

References

Onchidorididae
Gastropods described in 1889
Endemic fauna of Chile